Rich and Strange, released in the United States as East of Shanghai, is a 1931 romance film directed by Alfred Hitchcock during his time in the British film industry. The film was adapted by Hitchcock, his wife Alma Reville, and Val Valentine from the 1930 novel by Dale Collins. The title is an allusion to words of Ariel's song "Full fathom five" in Shakespeare's The Tempest.

Plot 
A couple, Fred (Henry Kendall) and Emily "Em" Hill (Joan Barry), living a mundane middle-class life in London, receive a letter informing them that an uncle will give them, as an advance against their future inheritance, as much money as they need to enjoy themselves in the present. Immediately Fred quits his job as a clerk and they book passage on an ocean liner bound from Marseille for "the Orient". Fred quickly shows his susceptibility to seasickness while crossing the English Channel. In Paris, both are scandalised by the Folies Bergère.

As they cross the Mediterranean, Fred's seasickness keeps him in bed. Left alone on board, Em begins spending time with and develops feelings for Commander Gordon (Percy Marmont), a dapper, popular bachelor. Finally feeling well enough to appear on deck, Fred is immediately smitten with a German "princess" (Betty Amann), who hits him in the eye with the rope ring used to play deck tennis (a combination of tennis and quoits which was at the time widely played shipboard). As the liner stops in Port Said and then Colombo, Fred and Em begin spending all their time on board with their new paramours, to the virtual exclusion of each other, and each ponders dissolving the marriage.

When the passengers disembark at Singapore, Em leaves with Gordon for his home in Kuala Lumpur. However, as they travel to the train station, Gordon reveals to Em that he has known all along that the princess is a sham, aiming to use Fred until his money is gone and then abandon him. Em realises she can't leave Fred to this fate, and leaves Gordon to warn her husband. Fred does not believe her at first, but soon discovers his lover has left without him for Rangoon, with £1000 of his money. He learns she was merely the daughter of a Berlin laundry owner. Fred and Em have only enough money left to book passage home to England on a tramp steamer.

However, Fred and Em's troubles have not ended, as the ship is abandoned after a collision in the fog. They are trapped in their cabin and prepare themselves for a watery end. In the morning, however, they awake to find the ship still afloat, and escape through a porthole. A Chinese junk arrives, and the crew proceed to loot the ship. Fred and Em rescue a cat from their sinking ship and board the junk. The Chinese crew feed Fred and Em, who are thrilled to eat again, until they discover the crew have cooked the cat and served it to them. Fred and Em finally return home to London during a rain storm, with their love strengthened and seemingly wiser for their experiences. In the last scene, they argue in a manner reminiscent of their bickering immediately prior to the arrival of the fateful letter.

Cast
Henry Kendall as Fred Hill
Joan Barry as Emily Hill
Percy Marmont as Commander Gordon
Betty Amann as The Princess
Elsie Randolph as The Old Maid, a fellow ship's passenger who annoys everyone

Production
The film exhibits techniques developed by Hitchcock in his later films. Most notable are the shipboard sets, including a recreation of a full-size ship in a water tank. The director also experimented with camera techniques and shot compositions, most prominently in the film's innovative opening sequence, which shows city office workers leaving work at the end of the day. This dialogue-free scene was made on a specially-constructed set and filmed in a single continuous pan shot, and is followed by an extended comedic sequence depicting Fred's workaday travails as he travels home on the train.

Reception

Released during Hitchcock's period between The Lodger (1927) and his breakthrough hits The Man Who Knew Too Much (1934) and The 39 Steps (1935), Rich and Strange was a failure at both the British and US box office. The film's lack of commercial and critical success is often attributed to the fact that there is dialogue for only about a quarter of the film, and that many features of silent films remain, including scene captions, exaggerated acting styles and heavy makeup. Hitchcock's experiment in pre-sound emotive performances over dialogue was possibly another contributing factor. An early scene of Fred leaving work for home via the London Underground is very reminiscent of Chaplin and highly dissimilar to typical Hitchcock staging.

Copyright and home video status
Rich and Strange, like all of Hitchcock's other British films, is copyrighted worldwide but has been heavily bootlegged on home video. Despite this, various licensed, restored releases have appeared on DVD from Optimum in the UK, Lionsgate in the US and many others.

References

External links 
 
 
 Rich and Strange at the British Film Institute's Screenonline
 Alfred Hitchcock Collectors’ Guide: Rich and Strange at Brenton Film
Cinema Then, Cinema Now: Rich and Strange a 1990 discussion of the film hosted by Jerry Carlson of CUNY TV

1931 films
1931 romantic comedy films
British black-and-white films
Films shot at British International Pictures Studios
Films based on Australian novels
Films directed by Alfred Hitchcock
Seafaring films
British romantic comedy films
1930s English-language films
1930s British films
Films set in London
Films set in France
Films set in Egypt